The 2013 season was the Minnesota Vikings' 53rd in the National Football League. It also marked the Vikings' final season playing their home games at the Hubert H. Humphrey Metrodome; the team played their home games at TCF Bank Stadium for the 2014 and 2015 seasons while construction of U.S. Bank Stadium, which opened in 2016, took place on the site of the Metrodome. Following a Week 9 loss to the Dallas Cowboys, the Vikings were no longer able to match their 10–6 record from 2012, and their loss to the Baltimore Ravens five weeks later sealed their elimination from playoff contention.

The Vikings failed to win a road game (0–7–1) for the first time since 2001. Much like in 2001, the Vikings did moderately well (13th) on offensive yardage (344.2 yards per game) despite a quarterback carousel not present in 2001, but ranked among the worst in defensive yardage (397.6 yards per game); only the Dallas Cowboys gave up more yards on defense with 415.3 per game. The Vikings' defense also allowed the most points in the NFL in 2013 at 480 (30.0 points per game), four points shy of matching the most points the team ever allowed in a single season.

It took until Week 10 for the Vikings to record their first win on American soil, their only other victory up to that point having come in the NFL International Series game against the Pittsburgh Steelers at London's Wembley Stadium in Week 4. Despite winning their last four home games to finish with an overall record of 5–10–1, the Vikings fired head coach Leslie Frazier after just over three seasons with the team.

Offseason

Draft

Notes
 The Vikings traded WR Percy Harvin to the Seattle Seahawks in exchange for Seattle's first- and seventh-round selections (25th and 214th overall), and 2014 third-round selection (96th overall).
 The Vikings traded their second-, third- and seventh-round selections (52nd, 83rd and 229th overall), as well as the fourth-round pick they received from the Detroit Lions (102nd overall), to the New England Patriots in exchange for New England's first-round selection (29th overall).
 The Vikings traded the 2012 fifth- and seventh-round selections (138th and 223rd overall) they received from the New England Patriots to the Detroit Lions in exchange for Detroit's 2012 seventh-round selection (219th overall) and 2013 fourth-round selection (102nd overall).
 During the 2012 NFL Draft, the Vikings traded the 2012 seventh-round selection they received from the Cleveland Browns (211th overall) to the Tennessee Titans in exchange for Tennessee's 2013 sixth-round selection (176th overall).
 The Vikings traded the sixth-round selection they received from the Tennessee Titans (176th overall) to the Arizona Cardinals in exchange for Arizona's seventh-round selection (213th overall) and CB A. J. Jefferson.
 The Vikings traded their sixth-round selection (189th overall) to the Tampa Bay Buccaneers in exchange for the sixth-round selection they received from the Denver Broncos (196th overall) and the seventh-round selection they received from the Vikings via the New England Patriots (229th overall).

Roster changes

 Denotes this is a reserve/future contract.
 Denotes a signing to the Practice Squad.

Preseason

Schedule
The Vikings' preseason opponents and schedule were announced on April 4, 2013. Their preseason began with a loss to the Houston Texans at Mall of America Field on August 9, followed by road defeats against the Buffalo Bills and the San Francisco 49ers; the game against the 49ers was the Vikings' second preseason matchup against the same opposition in two years. The preseason program concluded on a positive note – a home victory against the Tennessee Titans on August 29.

Game summaries

Week 1: vs. Houston Texans

Week 2: at Buffalo Bills

Week 3: at San Francisco 49ers

Week 4: vs. Tennessee Titans

Regular season

Schedule

Team names in bold indicate the Vikings' divisional opponents.
 #  Blue/red indicates the International Series game in London.

Game summaries

Week 1: at Detroit Lions

Week 2: at Chicago Bears

Week 3: vs. Cleveland Browns

Week 4: vs. Pittsburgh Steelers
NFL International Series

Week 6: vs. Carolina Panthers

Week 7: at New York Giants

Week 8: vs. Green Bay Packers

With Josh Freeman ruled out after suffering a concussion in the previous game, Christian Ponder reclaimed his spot as starting quarterback. Cordarrelle Patterson got the game off to a good start for the Vikings, returning the opening kickoff 109 yards for a touchdown to tie the NFL record. However, Aaron Rodgers responded for the Packers by leading his offense on a 14-play, 90-yard drive, culminating in an 11-yard touchdown pass to Jordy Nelson. The sides then exchanged field goals before Rodgers found Nelson again in the second quarter for a 76-yard touchdown. On the Vikings' next possession, they were forced to punt, but Micah Hyde was able to return the kick 93 yards for another Packers touchdown to make the score 24–10. A controversial pass interference call against Packers cornerback Tramon Williams late in the half set the Vikings up with a first down on the Packers' 14-yard line; two plays later, Adrian Peterson had the ball in the end zone for an 8-yard touchdown, which kept the Vikings in with a chance going into the second half.

But the Packers offense remained unstoppable as Rodgers again led a long drive, capped by a 1-yard touchdown run from Eddie Lacy after they had converted three times on third down and once on fourth down during the series. After another three-and-out for the Vikings, the Packers offense picked up four first downs in the space of five plays on the way to a 25-yard touchdown run for James Starks. The Vikings again went three-and-out on their next possession, but this time their defense was able to stop Green Bay at the goal line, limiting them to a 20-yard Mason Crosby field goal to make the score 41–17 with just over six minutes to play. Patterson again had a big return on the ensuing kickoff, taking it 51 yards to the Minnesota 42-yard line to set up a short field. Five plays later, Toby Gerhart narrowed the deficit to 17 points with a 13-yard touchdown run. Vikings cornerback Josh Robinson was penalized on the onside kick that followed for touching the ball before it had gone 10 yards, allowing the Packers to run down the clock before Crosby slotted another field goal, this time from 45 yards. Inside the two-minute warning, Ponder threw an incompletion on fourth down, only for Tramon Williams to again be penalized for pass interference against Patterson, allowing Ponder the opportunity for a 19-yard touchdown run two plays later. The Vikings were unable to recover the onside kick, and Green Bay knelt out the clock for a 44–31 win.

Week 9: at Dallas Cowboys

Following the high-scoring loss to the Packers, the Vikings, continuing with Christian Ponder as their quarterback, travel to Arlington, Texas to face the Dallas Cowboys. The first quarter was all field goals, as Dallas scored first with a 41-yarder by Dan Bailey, followed by a 23-yarder for the Vikings by Blair Walsh. In the second quarter, Bailey made another field goal from 44 yards to put the Cowboys up by 3, but the Vikings took a 10–6 lead into halftime, capping the ensuing 79-yard drive with a 6-yard run by Ponder.

After the half, Cowboy quarterback Tony Romo completed two consecutive 26-yard passes to tight end Jason Witten to give them an early touchdown and restore their three-point lead. On the very next play from scrimmage, Ponder fumbled the ball as he was sacked in the end zone, and the Cowboys' Nick Hayden recovered it for a touchdown, meaning the Vikings went from 10–6 up to 20–10 down in the space of two scrimmage plays. The Vikings responded immediately with a quick, six-play drive, culminating with a 31-yard pass from Ponder to Kyle Rudolph to cut the Cowboys' lead back to three points.

After a series of punts going into the fourth quarter, Adrian Peterson scored for the Vikings with an 11-yard run with almost six minutes to go, but Walsh pushed the extra point kick wide right, giving the Vikings a three-point lead over the Cowboys. Vikings cornerback A. J. Jefferson intercepted Romo on the Cowboys' ensuing drive, putting the Vikings in a position to potentially take over the game, but the offense went three-and-out and was forced to punt. The Cowboys progressed downfield quickly, never faced with a third down, and scored with a 7-yard touchdown pass from Romo to Dwayne Harris, the third time the Vikings had given up a game-winning score in 2013. With less than 30 seconds to play, but they were unable to make any significant territorial gains and Ponder's last-second hail mary fell short, giving the Cowboys a 27–23 win.

Week 10: vs. Washington Redskins

Week 11: at Seattle Seahawks

Week 12: at Green Bay Packers

The Vikings traveled to Green Bay in week 12 to face a Packers team missing quarterback Aaron Rodgers, who had suffered a fractured left collarbone three weeks earlier. After successive punts from each side started the game, the Packers were the first to score as backup QB Scott Tolzien ran in for a 6-yard touchdown, but two field goals from Blair Walsh and a 1-yard touchdown run for Adrian Peterson meant the Vikings took a 13–7 lead into halftime. They extended their lead midway through the third quarter as Christian Ponder hit tight end Rhett Ellison for a 12-yard touchdown, and Walsh made it a 16-point lead with a 29-yard field goal on the second play of the fourth quarter.

The Packers pulled the struggling Tolzien after the Ellison touchdown and replaced him with the recently re-signed Matt Flynn. Flynn then led the Packers on three consecutive scoring drives in the fourth quarter, starting with a 3-yard touchdown run for Eddie Lacy. Flynn's pass to Andrew Quarless on the two-point attempt fell incomplete, but Flynn was able to find Jarrett Boykin for a 6-yard touchdown on the next drive to reduce the Vikings' lead to three points. Inside the two-minute warning, Flynn combined with James Jones for a 28-yard completion on 4th-and-6, setting up Mason Crosby for the game-tying, 27-yard field goal. The Packers won the overtime coin toss and took the opening possession down to the Minnesota 2-yard line before having to settle for a field goal, only for Walsh to respond with a 35-yard effort. The two sides then exchanged possession as neither was able to put together a significant drive and the game ended in a 26–26 tie.

Week 13: vs. Chicago Bears

Week 14: at Baltimore Ravens

Playing in the snow in Baltimore, the Vikings sought out their first road win of the season. During the first half, Adrian Peterson injured his ankle and was dropped from the game. Despite taking the lead with a touchdown late in the fourth quarter, the Vikings were unable to hold on as the Ravens scored a game-winning touchdown with four seconds left. With the loss, the Vikings dropped to 3–9–1 and were officially eliminated from postseason contention.

Week 15: vs. Philadelphia Eagles

Week 16: at Cincinnati Bengals

Week 17: vs. Detroit Lions

In the last game to be played at the Metrodome before its demolition, the Vikings hosted their divisional rivals, the Detroit Lions. This turned out to be the only game of the Vikings' season (including preseason) in which the opposing team scored fewer than 20 points. A 50-yard run from Cordarrelle Patterson for the first score of the game put the Vikings up 7-0, where the score remained through halftime. After the half, Reggie Bush struck back with a 19-yard touchdown reception to tie the game at 7-7 in the third. The fourth quarter saw David Akers make two field goals to put the Lions in the lead 13-7. However, Matt Cassel threw a TD pass to Patterson to put the Vikings back in the lead 14-13, which they managed to hold onto for the remaining nine minutes of the game.

Head coach Leslie Frazier was fired as head coach of the Minnesota Vikings the following day. His tenure ended with a record of 21–32–1 in over three years.

Standings

Division

Conference

Staff

Roster

Statistics

Team leaders

* Vikings single season record.

League rankings

References

External links

2013 Minnesota Vikings at ESPN
2013 Minnesota Vikings at Pro Football Reference

Minnesota
Minnesota Vikings seasons
Minnesota